Tenodera acuticauda is a species of mantis in the family Mantidae.

Range
China (Changshou County, Sichuan).

References

Insects of China
Mantidae
Insects described in 1997